Midnight Sun is the fifth and final studio album by Redgum, released through Epic Records in November 1986.

John Schumann had left the group in 1985 to pursue a solo career, so Hugh McDonald took over as lead singer. Michael Atkinson left the group in 1987 after its release; the remaining members toured until 1990 to pay off the band's debts, and then disbanded.

Track listing
Side A
"Talk" (Hugh McDonald/Michael Spicer) - 4:21
"When Your Luck Ran Out" (Hugh McDonald) - 5:48
"Running with the Hurricane" (Hugh McDonald/Michael Atkinson) - 3:47
"Empty Page" (Michael Spicer/Verity Truman) - 4:39
"Midnight Sun" (Michael Atkinson) - 4:45

Side B
"Too Many Dollars" (Michael Atkinson) - 3:44
"Another Country" (Michael Atkinson) - 5:02
"In Their Hands" (Verity Truman) - 4:30
"Blood upon the Rain" (Hugh McDonald/Michael Atkinson) - 4:24
"La Partida (The Parting)" (Victor Jara) - 3:05

Charts

Personnel
 Michael Atkinson - bass, vocals
 Hugh McDonald - lead vocals, guitars, violin
 Michael Spicer - keyboards, flute
 Verity Truman - vocals, saxophone, flute
 Alex Pertout
 Chris Doheny
 Dave Clabour
 David Burgos
 Eddie Rayner
 John Barrett
 Lisa Young
 Roger McLachlan
 Shane Howard
 Trevor Courtney

References

1986 albums
Redgum albums